Billy Watkins (1927-2010) was a gospel and soul singer who later became a Christian minister. He was also founder of the gospel singing group, The Zion Travelers. He recorded for the Arwin, Challenge, Chess, Era, Imperial, Kent and Victor labels.

Background
Watkins was born to parents Bartha Lillard Watkins and Priscilla Kinard on July 25, 1927.  When he was 11 years old, he and his family The family moved to California. A short time later Watkins was working in a barber shop shining shoes. While working there he met Nat King Cole who would have a significant influence on him. He was also a member of the gospel group, The Zion Travelers.

Music career

The Zion Travelers
Known as Bartha L. Watkins, he was a member The Zion Travelers, a group that was formed in 1944 and first recorded in late 1947. Watkins was one of the lead singers. The other was L.C. Cohen. Other members were  Tenors, L.W. Van and Garland Fate Mason, baritone singer Wesley Sherman and bass singer Felton Vernon. The group also recorded in the 1950s on Sultan Records and Aladdin Records. In 1954, they had a single "Moving Up King's Highway" bw "Where Is My Wandering Child" out on Score 5054. The B side was composed by Wakkins. They also had recordings released in the 1960s. Watkins may no longer been a member by then.

Solo
By October 1959, Wakins had a record out on the Challenge label. The record "You're Unforgettable" bw "Rendezvous" which Billboard predicted could do well was charting locally that year. Later he had another single released on Challenge. I was "Go Billy Go" bw "Good Times" in 1960. The A side was co-written with Tony Hilder and Charles Wright. By October 1966, he had "Little Things Mean a Lot" out on the Chattahoochee label which was a Hot 100 prediction.

Around 1970, Watkins was in Japan. He had an album released there on the Japanese Victor label. The album was Golden Soul & Country.

Having toured throughout the United States, Europe, the Orient and Australia, and having some chart success, it was in the early 1970s that he decided to make a change both musically and spiritually. So when he got back to the US, he decided to stay with gospel music.

Ministry
He would later become an ordained pastor and establish the Freedom of Spirit Church, a non-denominational church in South Central Los Angeles. He also appeared regularly on television at Los Angeles' Christian television station KAGL.

Death
Watkins died at Centinela Hospital Medical Center Medical at Inglewood California on January 24, 2010.

Discography

References

1927 births
2010 deaths
American male singer-songwriters
20th-century African-American male singers
Singer-songwriters from Arkansas
American soul singers
Northern soul musicians
American rhythm and blues singers
Arwin Records artists
Challenge Records (1950s) artists
Chess Records artists
Era Records artists
Imperial Records artists
Kent Records artists
American clergy
American Christians
African-American Christians
African-American Christian clergy
African-American songwriters
21st-century African-American people